"Love's Divine" is a song by Seal. It was released as the second single from his fourth studio album Seal IV. The official music video was directed by Sanji and marks the first occasion that Ukrainian model and actress Olga Kurylenko appears in an acting role.
The song is written in F sharp minor

Formats and track listings

Maxi CD single
"Love's Divine" (album version) – 4:35
"Love's Divine" (Passangerz Sanctuary club mix) – 8:56
"Love's Divine" (Deepsky edit) – 4:32
"Love's Divine" (Passengerz Divine radio mix) – 3:55

CD single
"Love's Divine" (album version) – 4:35
"Love's Divine" (Passangerz Sanctuary club mix) – 8:56

Charts

Weekly charts

Year-end charts

Cover versions 
Brazilian band Babado Novo recorded a version for the 2004 DVD, Uau! Ao Vivo em Salvador. The song is also on the extended play, Uau! Babado Novo Ao Vivo.

References

External links
 Music video on MTV.com

2003 singles
Music videos directed by Sanaa Hamri
Seal (musician) songs
Songs written by Seal (musician)
Songs written by Mark Batson
Song recordings produced by Trevor Horn
2003 songs
ZTT Records singles
Song recordings produced by Mark Batson